Patrimonio is a commune in the French department of Upper Corsica, collectivity and island of Corsica.

The inhabitants are known as patrimoniens and patrimoniennes in French, patrimuninchi (singular: patrimunincu, patrimuninca) in Corsican, and patrimoniesi (singular: patrimoniese) in Italian.

Geography
Located 12 km from Bastia and 4 km from the micro-region of Saint-Florent, this wine-growing commune is the gateway to the Cap Corse (peninsula at the northernmost point of Corsica).

History
The village of Patrimonio is known for the quality of its AOC (quality-controlled designation of origin) wines and for its guitar nights. The festival lasts for a week.

Population

Sights
 A menhir (or standing stone) found in a vine in 1964 by two labourers, the Gilormini brothers from Patrimonio. (The menhir is called "U Nativu".) 
 St. Martin's Church (San Martinu)
 The small Santa Maria chapel

See also
Communes of the Haute-Corse department

References

External links 
 Photos of the village
 Official site (in French) of the annual guitar festival (Les Nuits de la guitare de Patrimonio)

Communes of Haute-Corse